Royal Bank of Canada v R, is a notable Canadian constitutional decision of the Judicial Committee of the Privy Council where the Council limited the province's ability to create laws in relation to extraprovincial contractual rights.

Background
In 1909, the Alberta and Great Waterways Railway Company was incorporated by an Act of the Legislative Assembly of Alberta. Another Act was passed in the same year to authorize the Province to guarantee the principal and interest of bonds that were to be issued by the Company. The proceeds of the bonds raised in England were credited to a Railway Special Account set up by the province and kept in a branch of the Royal Bank of Canada in Edmonton, and the Company proceeded to enter into a contract with the Canada West Construction Company.

In 1910, public uneasiness was raised concerning the arrangements that had been entered into by the Province, and a royal commission  of inquiry was set up to look into the matter. While the commission was deliberating, a new government was formed that proceeded to pass two new Actsthe first authorizing the transfer of the balance in the Railway Special Account into the General Revenue Fund of the Province on the basis that the company had defaulted on the construction of the railway, and the second providing that anyone suffering loss or damage under the first Act must file a claim with the Government that would be reported to the Legislature. When the Provincial Treasurer arranged to issue a cheque to draw the balance out of the special account, the Royal Bank of Canada refused to honour it. The Province then proceeded to sue the Bank for the funds, and the two Companies were joined in the action as defendants.

The courts below
At first instance, the District Court of Northern Alberta, Stuart J. ruled that the proceeds of the bond issue were within the Province, and therefore the matter was one of a local nature in it. Accordingly, the Act was validly passed and judgment was issued in favour of the Province.

The judgment was upheld by the Supreme Court of Alberta in a unanimous decision.

Appeal to the Privy Council
Appeal was allowed by the Privy Council, which noted that the law in this field provided that the lenders in London were entitled to claim from the Bank at its head office in Montreal the money which they had advanced for a purpose that had ceased to exist. Therefore, this was a civil right that existed outside the Province of Alberta, and the Legislature of Alberta could not legislate validly against it.

Aftermath
The absolute rule in Royal Bank of Canada v R has since been relaxed somewhat by Re Upper Churchill Water Rights Reversion Act to allow for incidental effects, where, as noted by McIntyre J.:

See also
 List of Judicial Committee of the Privy Council cases

References

1913 in Canadian case law
Canadian constitutional case law
Judicial Committee of the Privy Council cases on appeal from Canada
Royal Bank of Canada